Québec—Montmorency was a federal electoral district in Quebec, Canada, that was represented in the House of Commons of Canada from 1925 to 1968.

This riding was created in 1924 from parts of Charlevoix—Montmorency and Quebec County ridings.

It was abolished in 1966 when it was redistributed into Louis-Hébert, Montmorency and Portneuf ridings.

Members of Parliament

This riding elected the following Members of Parliament:

Election results

See also 

 List of Canadian federal electoral districts
 Past Canadian electoral districts

External links
 Riding history from the Library of Parliament

Former federal electoral districts of Quebec